James A. Pabian (April 14, 1909 – July 23, 1996) was an American animator, screenwriter and director. In the 1930s, he worked as an animator for Ub Iwerks, Leon Schlesinger Productions and Harman & Ising. Pabian then worked for the MGM cartoon department in the 1940s, and later branched out as a comic artist for Dell Comics in the 1940s and 1950s, and created the syndicated daily comic strips Hollywood Johnnie, Screen Girl, and Go Go Gruver. He also worked on various Disney comics.

In the 1950s, he worked for John Sutherland and later co-wrote (with Chuck Jones) and directed the Tom and Jerry short The Brothers Carry-Mouse-Off. He also co-wrote (again with Jones) another Tom and Jerry short, Haunted Mouse. Both were released by MGM in 1965. He was also listed as a "graphic blandishment" artist on the 1972 Peanuts film Snoopy Come Home.

Pabian died on July 23, 1996, aged 87.

References

External links 
 Jim Pabian in IMDb: https://www.imdb.com/name/nm0655030/
 Lambiek Comiclopedia article.

American male screenwriters
American film directors
American comics artists
Disney comics artists
American animators
American animated film directors
Warner Bros. Cartoons people
1909 births
1996 deaths
20th-century American male writers
20th-century American screenwriters